John David Wilson (8 August 1919 – 20 June 2013) was an English artist, animator and producer. He owned his own production studio, Fine Arts Films.

Early years

Wilson was born on 8 August 1919 in Wimbledon, England. He was educated at the Watford Grammar School for Boys, Harrow Art School and the Royal College of Art; among his teachers was Robin Darwin.

World War II

During World War II, Wilson served with the London Rifle Brigade. He was badly wounded in the African Campaign in 1941; while recuperating in Cairo he spent time drawing cartoons. Some of these were brought to the attention of a printer in Durban who offered him a job; due to the seriousness of his injury he was discharged from the army and accepted the job.

Death
He died in Blackpool, England in 2013. In his last years, he had suffered from Alzheimer's disease.

Credits

Film
Great Expectations (1946)
Peter Pan (1953)
Lady and the Tramp (1955)
Journey to the Stars (shown at The 1962 Seattle World's Fair) (1962)
Shinbone Alley (1970)
Grease (1978) (titles)
You Gotta Serve Somebody (1983) 
FernGully: The Last Rainforest (1992)

Television
Mr. Magoo (TV series) (1953)
Petrushka (segment on Sol Hurok Music Hour) (1956)
The Sonny and Cher Show (TV series) (1970–73)
The Carol Burnett Show (TV series) (1972–76)
COS w/Bill Cosby (TV series) (1976)
Stanley, the Ugly Duckling (TV show) (1982)
Peter Pan and the Pirates (TV show) (1990)
Space Cats (TV show) (1991)
The Specialists (TV show) (1992)
Madeline (TV show) (1994)

References

External links
 Fine Arts Films Official website
 
 Documentary on Dailymotion

Alumni of the Royal College of Art
British Army personnel of World War II
Neurological disease deaths in England
Deaths from Alzheimer's disease
English animators
British film producers
British animated film producers
1919 births
2013 deaths
People from Wimbledon, London
People educated at Watford Grammar School for Boys